Vladas Jurgutis (17 November 1885 in Joskaudai near Palanga – 9 January 1966 in Vilnius) was a Lithuanian priest, economist, and professor. As the first chairman of the Bank of Lithuania he is unofficially considered to be the "father of the Lithuanian litas."

Biography

In 1902 Jurgutis graduated from a high school in Palanga and enrolled in the Kaunas Priest Seminary. After graduation in 1906 he continued his studies at the Saint Petersburg Roman Catholic Theological Academy and received a Master's Degree in 1910. From 1910 to 1913 he studied economics at Munich University. In 1913 he served as a priest in Švėkšna and later in Liepāja. During World War I Jurgutis retreated to Russia, where he worked as a pastor in Saratov and Astrakhan. Upon his return to Lithuania, he worked at the Kaunas Priest Seminary until 1922. Jurgutis became active in Lithuanian politics, but never officially quit the priesthood.

Jurgutis was one of the initiators of the revival of the Lithuanian Christian Democratic Party. He was elected to the Constituent Assembly of Lithuania (1920–1922) and headed a Finance and Budget Committee. From 1 January 1922 to 28 September 1922 Jurgutis served as the Foreign Minister of Lithuania in the Cabinet of Ernestas Galvanauskas. He resigned to become the first chairman of the Bank of Lithuania. He served in this position until 1929. From 1925 he taught at the University of Lithuania, from 1940 at the University of Vilnius. Jurgutis was the President of the Lithuanian Academy of Sciences from 1941 to 1943, when he, along with other prominent public figures, was arrested and transported to the Stutthof concentration camp by the Nazi authorities. He returned to Lithuania in 1945 and retired from public life.

In 1997 the Bank of Lithuania established Vladas Jurgutis scholarship and Vladas Jurgutis Award to encourage scientific activities in the area of research on Lithuania‘s banking, finance, money and macroeconomics.

Jurgutis was a member of the Catholic youth and student organization Ateitis.

References

1885 births
1966 deaths
Ministers of Foreign Affairs of Lithuania
Lithuanian economists
Chairmen of the Bank of Lithuania
Academic staff of Vilnius University
People from Palanga
Ludwig Maximilian University of Munich alumni
Academic staff of Vytautas Magnus University
20th-century Lithuanian Roman Catholic priests
Stutthof concentration camp survivors